The 1911–12 season saw Rochdale compete in The F.A. Cup for the 4th time and reached the fourth qualifying round. The also competed in the Lancashire Combination Division 1 and finished top of the table for the second consecutive season.

Statistics

|}

Competitions

Lancashire Combination Division 1

Lancashire Combination Divisional play-off

F.A. Cup

Lancashire Senior Cup

Manchester Senior Cup

Friendlies

References

Rochdale A.F.C. seasons
Rochdale